The Allan Ministry (also known as the Allan–Peacock Ministry) was the 44th ministry of the Government of Victoria. It was led by the Premier of Victoria, John Allan, and was formed by a coalition of the Country and Nationalist parties. The ministry was sworn in on 18 November 1924.

Portfolios

References

Victoria (Australia) ministries
Ministries of George V